Kislyakov is a Russian masculine surname, its feminine counterpart is Kislyakova. It may refer to
Nikolai Kislyakov (1901–1973), Soviet ethnologist 
Roman Kislyakov (born 1988), Ukrainian football player
Yevgeny Kislyakov (born 1967), Soviet rower

See also
Kislyakovo, a rural locality (a village) in Malyginskoye Rural Settlement, Kovrovsky District, Vladimir Oblast, Russia

Russian-language surnames